Lusty may refer to:

 Operation Lusty, a non-combat military operation
 HMS Illustrious (R06), a light aircraft carrier of the Royal Navy nicknamed Lusty

People with the surname
 Robert Lusty (1909–1991), British journalist and publisher

See also
 
 Lust (disambiguation)